Per Andersson may refer to:

 Per Andersson (biathlete) (born 1954), a Swedish Olympic biathlete
 Per Andersson (rower) (born 1971), a Swedish Olympic rower
 Per Andersson (actor) (born 1976), a Swedish actor

See also
 Per Andersson i Koldemo (1876–1944), Swedish politician